Palace of the Red Sun is a BBC Books original novel written by Christopher Bulis and based on the long-running British science fiction television series Doctor Who. It features the Sixth Doctor and Peri.

2002 British novels
2002 science fiction novels
Past Doctor Adventures
Sixth Doctor novels
Novels by Christopher Bulis
BBC Books books
Novels set on fictional planets